The Buck O'Neil Lifetime Achievement Award is an award presented by the National Baseball Hall of Fame not more than once every three years to honor an  individual who enhances baseball's positive image on society, who broadens the game's appeal, and whose integrity and dignity are comparable to the namesake of the award, John Jordan "Buck" O'Neil. There have been five recipients of the award since its inception in 2008.

History
In 2008, the Hall of Fame dedicated a life-size bronze statue of O'Neil near the entrance of its museum. With the statue are a list of recipients of the award and a plaque that summarizes O'Neil's contributions to the game of baseball. A smaller statue is given to each honoree at the induction ceremony during Hall of Fame Weekend.

Awardees

See also

John "Buck" O'Neil Legacy Award

References

External links
Buck O'Neil Award. National Baseball Hall of Fame and Museum official website

Buck O'Neil Award
Major League Baseball trophies and awards
Awards established in 2008
Lifetime achievement awards